"Ban" is the second single by Japanese idol group Sakurazaka46 after their 2020 renaming. It was released on April 14, 2021. The title track features Hikaru Morita as center. The music video was premiered on YouTube on March 17, 2021.

Track listing

Charts

Weekly charts

Year-end charts

References

2021 singles
2021 songs
Sakurazaka46 songs